Joško Milenkoski (born 9 January 1962) is a volleyball coach from North Macedonia, who coached Turkish national team at the 2017 Men's European Volleyball Championship.

Clubs 
 Borec Veles (1993–1994)
 Rabotnički (1994–2007)
 North Macedonia (1997–2008)
 OK Budvanska Rivijera (2007–2008)
 Rabotnički (2008–2010)
 CS Sfaxien (2010–2011)
 Maliye Milli Piyango SK (2011–2017)
 Turkey (2017)
 Ziraat Bankası Ankara (2017–2019)
 CS Sfaxien (2019–2020)
 Foinikas Syros (2021–2022)
 PAOK (2022–)

References

Living people
1962 births
Turkish volleyball coaches
Place of birth missing (living people)